Hyland Airport  is an airport located near Hyland, Yukon, Canada.

References

Registered aerodromes in Yukon